Highway 16 (AR 16, Ark. 16, and Hwy. 16) is an east–west state highway in Arkansas. The route begins in Siloam Springs at US Highway 412 (US 412) and Highway 59 and runs east through Fayetteville and the Ozark National Forest to US Highway 67 Business (US 67B) in Searcy. Highway 16 was created during the 1926 Arkansas state highway numbering, and today serves as a narrow, winding, 2-lane road except for overlaps of  through Fayetteville. Much of the highway winds through the Ozarks, including the Ozark National Forest, where a portion of the highway is designated as an Arkansas Scenic Byway. The route has two spur routes in Northwest Arkansas; in Fayetteville and Siloam Springs.

Route description

Highway 16 begins in Siloam Springs in Benton County, 3 miles (4.8 km) from the Oklahoma border. The highway's western terminus is US 412/AR 59 in a commercial area; it runs south to Kenwood Avenue, which is designated as Highway 16 Spur westbound. Highway 16 continues southeast, exiting the city and becoming a steep, winding road through the oak-hickory forest. Near the Washington County line, Highway 16 enters a small segment of the Ozark National Forest disconnected from the larger section of the forest north of Russellville. At the county line, Highway 16 serves as the eastern terminus of Highway 244, and briefly runs east along the county line as a section line road. In Washington County, Highway 16 continues east in the National Forest, serving the Lake Wedington Recreation Area, which contains the Lake Wedington Historic District, and crossing the Illinois River, the eastern boundary of the National Forest, near Savoy. It continues to wind through sparsely populated forested land, passing the unincorporated community of Wedington Woods before entering Fayetteville, the third-largest city in Arkansas and county seat of Washington County.

In west Fayetteville, Highway 16 becomes a four-lane highway with paved median, used as a two-way left turn lane (TWLTL), known as "Wedington Drive". The highway is a principal arterial in the City of Fayetteville's 2011 Master Street Plan. A focal point of growth in the rapidly developing Northwest Arkansas region, the Wedington Corridor has been subject to much planning and discussion in Fayetteville over the years, subject to biannual neighborhood planning charrettes by a broad group of Fayetteville stakeholders. The area was annexed into Fayetteville in pieces beginning in 1967, with the combination of a variety of land uses and zonings resulting in rapid growth, heavy traffic congestion, and limited pedestrian facilities. Highway 16 meets Interstate 49 (I-49) and unsigned US 71/US 62, beginning a southbound concurrency until exit 62. Highway 16 continues along an unsigned concurrency via Highway 180 (Martin Luther King Jr. Boulevard) eastbound to Highway 112 (Razorback Road), where it turns southbound near the entrance to the University of Arkansas. Highway 16 and Highway 112 continue south past Baum Stadium to an intersection, where Highway 16 turns east onto Fifteenth Street. The highway has a junction with US 71 Business (US 71B, School Avenue), and shortly thereafter a signalized crossing of the Razorback Greenway near Walker Park before continuing east as a two-lane road. Highway 16 gives access to the Fayetteville Industrial Park before becoming Huntsville Road, serving as the southern terminus of Highway 265.

The route enters Elkins, serves as the terminus of Highway 74, and continues south past Stokenbury Cemetery, Elkins High School, the Elkins Public Library, and the Elkins School District Central Office before exiting the town heading southeast. Highway 16 passes through the unincorporated community of Durham before entering Madison County. In the sparsely populated county, Highway 16 winds eastward near Cannon Creek, where it passes a former alignment, including a former bridge listed on the National Register of Historic Places, before continuing through several unincorporated communities, intersecting segments of Highway 295 at Crosses and Combs before intersecting Highway 23 at Brashears. This junction is the northern terminus of the Pig Trail Scenic Byway along Highway 23, an Arkansas Scenic Byway. The two highways form a concurrency through St. Paul. Northeast of the town, Highway 16 breaks from Highway 23 to the east. The area is sparsely populated with little development; most structures are historic churches, schools, and community centers like Williams Farmstead the former Pettigrew School, both listed on the NRHP. Highway 16 serves as the northern boundary for the White Rock Wildlife Management Area (WMA) within the Ozark National Forest, with access to hunting, fishing, camping, and hiking from various county roads at Dutton, Pettigrew, Boston, and Red Star.

Shortly after entering Newton County, Highway 16 intersects Highway 21 at Fallsville, and the two routes begin a concurrency heading northeast. They pass the Glory Hole Trail, a popular waterfall at the end of a hiking trail along an old logging road, and the southern edge of the Upper Buffalo Wilderness, which contains the famous Hawksbill Crag hiking trail. The overlap is also designated as part of the Ozark Highlands Scenic Byway, a state scenic byway connecting the Ozark National Forest and the Buffalo National River. The concurrency ends at Edwards Junction, and Highway 16 continues east through forested land as the northern boundary of the Piney Creeks Wildlife Management Area (WMA), owned by the Arkansas Game and Fish Commission, and passing through Deer before a junction with a third scenic byway. Highway 16 forms an overlap southward with Highway 7 to Lurton, where the routes begin an overlap with Highway 123 and enters Pope County near Sand Gap.

The concurrency ends at Sand Gap, with Highway 7 continuing south to Russellville, and Highway 123 running south to Clarksville. Highway 16 winds east, briefly reentering Newton County, returning to Pope County, and reentering Newton County to pass through Ben Hur, before returning to Pope County and running toward Raspberry. It briefly runs north into Searcy County, exiting the Ozark National Forest and serving as the southern terminus of Highway 377.

Highway 16 winds through rural areas, passing through Alread just north of the Gulf Mountain WMA, and ultimately entering Clinton. In the northern part of the city, Highway 16 intersects and forms a concurrency with US 65, which is also concurrent with Highway 9 in this area. After a bridge over Archey Fork (a tributary of the South Fork Little Red River), Highway 9 and Highway 16 turn east to an intersection with Highway 980, which provides access to Clinton Municipal Airport, and continue northeast to an intersection with Highway 110 near Shirley. In the city, Highway 9 splits north toward Mountain View, with Highway 16 running south to Fairfield Bay. An intersection with Highway 330 provides access to Van Buren Recreation Area and the Fairfield Bay Marina on Greers Ferry Lake. Highway 16 runs east along the northern edge of the planned community, serving as a main commercial thoroughfare in the community along the lake. Shortly after entering Cleburne County, the route turns south and crosses the upper section of Greers Ferry Lake. Across the lake, Highway 16 enters the City of Greers Ferry. It forms an overlap with Highway 92 southbound, where the routes intersect Highway 110 and Highway 336, and cross the lake again.

Shortly after entering Cleburne County, the route turns south and crosses the upper section of Greers Ferry Lake. Across the lake, Highway 16 enters the City of Greers Ferry. It forms an overlap with Highway 92 southbound, where the routes intersect Highway 110 and Highway 336, and cross the lake again. At Whispering Springs, Highway 92 breaks from the concurrency; Highway 16 runs along the southwestern side of the lake, providing access to several parks and recreation areas. Highway 16 intersects Highway 25, which is concurrent with Highway 107. The three highways run northeast; Highway 107 turns north toward Eden Isle, and the two remaining routes form a concurrency with Highway 5 south of Heber Springs. Highway 5, Highway 16, and Highway 25 run together for  before Highway 5/Highway 25 turn north, with Highway 16 continuing eastward to Pangburn.

In Pangburn, Highway 16 passes several historic homes, including the Walter Marsh House, John Shutter House, and the Austin Pangburn House before an intersection with Highway 124 (Searcy Street). Highway 16 turns south, passing the Churchill-Hilger House, James William Boggs House, Dr. McAdams House, and the Rufus Gray House before exiting town to the south. It passes the Albert Whisinant House on its way south to an intersection with Highway 305, near the Wesley Marsh House. Highway 16 also intersects Highway 310, which gives access to Letona to the west before entering Searcy, the county seat of White County, on the edge of the Central Arkansas region.

Highway 16 enters Searcy from the north, becoming Maple Street, and passing the historic Coward House. The highway crosses Deener Creek and the Searcy Bike Trail near Lions Stadium, home stadium of the Searcy High School football team. The highway curves due east, passing the Wood Freeman House No. 1 and Wood Freeman House No. 2 before becoming Race Avenue and entering downtown. Highway 16 runs as the northern edge of the town square, passing historic commercial structures, the American Legion Hall, and the Rialto Theater. After an intersection with Spring Street, Highway 16 passes the historic Cumberland Presbyterian Church and the Jesse N. Cypert Law Office to the north, and the headquarters of First Security Bank to the south. It runs east to Main Street, where the route terminates at US 67 Business (US 67B). At the intersection, US 67B turns from Main Street to Race Street eastbound.

Major intersections
Mile markers reset at some concurrencies

Fayetteville spur

Highway 16 Spur (AR 16S, Ark. 16S, and Hwy. 16S) is a  highway in Fayetteville. Locally known as Wedington Drive, its western terminus is at Highway 16 at Interstate 49. Its eastern terminus is at Highway 112 (Garland Avenue).

The route was designated as a state highway spur route around 1971, known as Highway 112 Spur. It was renumbered to Highway 16S in 2020 as part of a truncation of Highway 112 in Fayetteville.

Siloam Springs spur

Highway 16S (AR 16S, Ark. 16S, Hwy. 16S, and Kenwood Road) is an east–west state highway spur route in Siloam Springs. The route of  runs from US Route 412/Highway 59 (US 412/AR 59) east to Highway 16. Locally posted as East Kenwood Road, it serves as a short connector route for traffic eastbound on U.S. 412 to access eastbound Highway 16 or for traffic westbound on Highway 16 to access westbound U.S. 412.

See also

 Old Highway 16 Bridge, historic bridge along a former alignment of Highway 16 in the Edgemont vicinity

References

External links

Arkansas Heritage Trails System
Arkansas Scenic Byways
016
Transportation in Benton County, Arkansas
Transportation in Washington County, Arkansas
Transportation in Madison County, Arkansas
Transportation in Newton County, Arkansas
Transportation in Pope County, Arkansas
Transportation in Searcy County, Arkansas
Transportation in Van Buren County, Arkansas
Transportation in Cleburne County, Arkansas
Transportation in White County, Arkansas